Nikolai Ivanovich Yezhov (1 May 1895 – 4 February 1940) was a Soviet secret police official under Joseph Stalin who was head of the NKVD from 1936 to 1938, during the height of the Great Purge. Yezhov organized mass arrests, torture and executions during the Great Purge, but he fell from Stalin's favour and was arrested, subsequently admitting in a confession (that he later claimed was taken under torture) to a range of anti-Soviet activity including "unfounded arrests" during the Purge. He was executed in 1940 along with others who were blamed for the Purge.

Early life and career 
Yezhov was born either in Saint Petersburg, according to his official Soviet biography, or in southwest Lithuania (probably Veiveriai, Marijampolė or Kaunas). Although Yezhov claimed to be born in Saint Petersburg, hoping to "portray (himself) in the guise of a deeply-rooted proletarian", he confessed when interrogated that his father Ivan Yezhov came from a well-off Russian peasant family from the village of Volkhonshino. He worked as a musician, railroad switchman, forest warden, head of a brothel, and as a housepainting contractor employing a couple of hired workers. His mother Anna Antonovna Yezhova was Lithuanian. Despite writing in his official biographical forms that he knew Lithuanian and Polish, he denied this in his later interrogations.

He completed only his elementary education. From 1909 to 1915, he worked as a tailor's assistant and factory worker. From 1915 until 1917, Yezhov served in the Imperial Russian Army. He joined the Bolsheviks on 5 May 1917, in Vitebsk, six months before the October Revolution. During the Russian Civil War (1917–1922), he fought in the Red Army. After February 1922, he worked in the political system, mostly as a secretary of various regional committees of the Communist Party. In 1927, he was transferred to the Accounting and Distribution Department of the Party where he worked as an instructor and acting head of the department. From 1929 to 1930, he was the Deputy People's Commissar for Agriculture. In November 1930, he was appointed to the Head of several departments of the Communist Party: department of special affairs, department of personnel and department of industry. In 1934, he was elected to the Central Committee of the Communist Party; in the next year he became a secretary of the Central Committee. From February 1935 to March 1939, he was also the Chairman of the Central Commission for Party Control.

In the "Letter of an Old Bolshevik" (1936), written by Boris Nicolaevsky, there is Bukharin's description of Yezhov: 
Nadezhda Mandelstam, in contrast, who met Yezhov at Sukhum in the early thirties, did not perceive anything ominous in his manner or appearance; her impression of him was that of a "modest and rather agreeable person". Yezhov was short, standing , and that, combined with his perceived sadistic personality, led to his nickname "The Poison Dwarf" or "The Bloody Dwarf".

Personal life 
 

Yezhov married Antonina Titova, a minor Communist Party clerk, in 1919, but he later divorced her and married  (Khayutina-Yezhova), a Soviet publishing worker and Chief Editor of USSR in Construction magazine who was known for her friendship with many Soviet writers and actors. Yezhov and Feigenburg had an adopted daughter, Natalia, an orphan from a children's home. After Yevgenia's and Yezhov's deaths in late 1938 and 1940 respectively, Natalia was sent back to a local orphanage and was forced to relinquish the Yezhov surname. Subsequently, she was known by the name Natalia Khayutina.

Accusation of homosexuality 
Yezhov was accused of homosexual acts. When Yezhov was arrested in 1939, he stated during his interrogation that he had many lovers, including Filipp Goloshchyokin, then party functionary in Kazakh ASSR, during the latter half of 1925, and that they had shared an apartment in Kzyl-Orda.

Head of the NKVD 
A turning point for Yezhov came with Stalin's response to the 1934 murder of the Bolshevik chief of Leningrad, Sergei Kirov. Stalin used the murder as a pretext for further purges and he chose Yezhov to carry out the task. Yezhov oversaw falsified accusations in the Kirov murder case against opposition leaders Kamenev, Zinoviev and their supporters. Yezhov's success in this task led to his further promotion and ultimately to his appointment as head of the NKVD.

He became People's Commissar for Internal Affairs (head of the NKVD) and a member of the Central Committee on 26 September 1936, following the dismissal of Genrikh Yagoda. This appointment did not at first seem to suggest an intensification of the purge: "Unlike Yagoda, Yezhov did not come out of the 'organs', which was considered an advantage".

Party leadership revocation and executions of those found guilty during the Moscow Trials was not a problem for Yezhov. Seeming to be a devout admirer of Stalin and not a member of the organs of state security, Yezhov was just the man Stalin needed to lead the NKVD and rid the government of potential opponents. Yezhov's first task from Stalin was to personally investigate and conduct prosecution of his long-time Chekist mentor Yagoda, which he did with remorseless zeal. Yezhov ordered the NKVD to sprinkle mercury on the curtains of his office so that the physical evidence could be collected and used to support the charge that Yagoda was a German spy, sent to assassinate Yezhov and Stalin with poison and restore capitalism. Yezhov later admitted under a interrogation on 5 May 1939 that he had fabricated the mercury poisoning to "raise his authority in the eyes of the leadership of the country". It is also claimed that he personally tortured both Yagoda and Marshal Mikhail Tukhachevsky to extract their confessions.

Yagoda was but the first of many to die by Yezhov's orders. Under Yezhov, the Great Purge reached its height during 1937–1938. 50–75% of the members of the Supreme Soviet and officers of the Soviet military were stripped of their positions and imprisoned, exiled to the Gulag in Siberia or executed. In addition, a much greater number of ordinary Soviet citizens were accused (usually on flimsy or nonexistent evidence) of disloyalty or "wrecking" by local Chekist troikas and similarly punished to fill Stalin and Yezhov's arbitrary quotas for arrests and executions. Yezhov also conducted a thorough purge of the security organs, both NKVD and GRU, removing and executing not only many officials who had been appointed by his predecessors Yagoda and Menzhinsky, but even his own appointees as well. He admitted that innocents were being falsely accused, but dismissed their lives as unimportant so long as the purge was successful:  In 1937 and 1938 alone, at least 1.3 million were arrested and 681,692 were shot for 'crimes against the state'. The Gulag population swelled by 685,201 under Yezhov, nearly tripling in size in just two years, with at least 140,000 of these prisoners (and likely many more) dying of malnutrition, exhaustion and the elements in the camps (or during transport to them).

Fall from power 
Yezhov was appointed People's Commissar for Water Transport on 6 April 1938. During the Great Purge, acting on the orders from Stalin, he had accomplished liquidation of Old Bolsheviks and other potentially "disloyal elements" or "fifth columnists" within the Soviet military and government prior to the onset of war with Germany. The defection to Japan of the Far Eastern NKVD chief, Genrikh Lyushkov, on 13 June 1938, rightly worried Yezhov, who had earlier protected Lyushkov from the purges and now feared that he would be blamed for disloyalty.

Final days 
On 22 August 1938, NKVD leader Lavrenty Beria was named as Yezhov's deputy. Beria had managed to survive the Great Purge and the "Yezhovshchina" during the years 1936–1938, even though he had almost become one of its victims. Earlier in 1938, Yezhov had even ordered the arrest of Beria, who was party chief in Georgia. However, Georgian NKVD chief Sergei Goglidze warned Beria, who immediately flew to Moscow to see Stalin personally. Beria convinced Stalin to spare his life and reminded Stalin how efficiently he had carried out party orders in Georgia and Transcaucasia. In a twist of fate, it was Yezhov who eventually fell in the struggle for power, and Beria who became the new NKVD chief.

Over the following months, Beria (with Stalin's approval) began to usurp Yezhov's governance of the Commissariat for Internal Affairs. As early as 8 September, Mikhail Frinovsky, Yezhov's first deputy, was relocated from under his command into the Navy. Stalin's penchant for periodically executing and replacing his primary lieutenants was well known to Yezhov, as he had previously been the man most directly responsible for orchestrating such actions.

Well acquainted with typical Stalinist bureaucratic precursors to eventual dismissal and arrest, Yezhov recognized Beria's increasing influence with Stalin as a sign that his downfall was imminent, and he plunged headlong into alcoholism and despair. Already a heavy drinker, in the last weeks of his service, he reportedly was disconsolate, slovenly, and drunk nearly all of his waking hours, rarely bothering to show up to work. As anticipated, Stalin and Vyacheslav Molotov, in a report dated November 11, sharply criticised the work and methods of the NKVD during Yezhov's tenure as chief, thus establishing the bureaucratic pretense necessary to remove him from power.

On 14 November, another of Yezhov’s protégés, the Ukrainian NKVD chief Aleksandr Uspensky, disappeared after being warned by Yezhov that he was in trouble. Stalin suspected that Yezhov was involved in the disappearance and told Beria, not Yezhov, that Uspensky must be caught (he was arrested on 14 April 1939). Yezhov had told his wife, Yevgenia, on 18 September that he wanted a divorce, and she had begun writing increasingly despairing letters to Stalin, none of which was answered. She was particularly vulnerable because of her many lovers, and for months people close to her were being arrested. On 19 November 1938, Yevgenia committed suicide by taking an overdose of sleeping pills.

At his own request, Yezhov was officially relieved of his post as the People's Commissar for Internal Affairs on 25 November, succeeded by Beria, who had been in complete control of the NKVD since the departure of Frinovsky on 8 September. He attended his last Politburo meeting on 29 January 1939.

Stalin was evidently content to ignore Yezhov for several months, finally ordering Beria to denounce him at the annual Presidium of the Supreme Soviet. On 3 March 1939, Yezhov was relieved of all his posts in the Central Committee, but retained his post as People's Commissar of Water Transportation. His last working day was 9 April, at which time the "People’s Commissariat was simply abolished by splitting it into two, the People’s Commissariats of the River Fleet and the Sea Fleet, with two new People’s Commissars, Z. A. Shashkov and S. S. Dukel’skii."

Arrest 
On 10 April, Yezhov was arrested and imprisoned at the Sukhanovka prison; the "arrest was painstakingly concealed, not only from the general public but also from most NKVD officers... It would not do to make a fuss about the arrest of 'the leader’s favourite,' and Stalin had no desire to arouse public interest in NKVD activity and the circumstances of the conduct of the Great Terror." A letter from Beria, Andreyev and Malenkov to Stalin, dated 29 January 1939, accused the NKVD of allowing "massive, unfounded arrests of completely innocent persons", and stated that the leadership of Yezhov "did not put a stop to this kind of arbitrariness and extremism...but sometimes itself abetted it."

In his confession, Yezhov admitted to the standard litany of state crimes necessary to mark him as an "enemy of the people" prior to execution, including "wrecking", official incompetence, theft of government funds, and treasonous collaboration with German spies and saboteurs. Apart from these political crimes, he was also accused of and confessed to a humiliating history of sexual promiscuity, including homosexuality, rumors that were later deemed true by some post-Soviet examinations of the case.

Trial 
On 2 February 1940, Yezhov was tried by the Military Collegium, chaired by Soviet judge Vasiliy Ulrikh, behind closed doors. Yezhov, like his predecessor Yagoda, maintained to the end his love for Stalin. Yezhov denied being a spy, a terrorist, or a conspirator, stating that he preferred "death to telling lies". He maintained that his previous confession had been obtained under torture, admitted that he had purged 14,000 of his fellow Chekists, but said that he was surrounded by "enemies of the people". He also said that he would die with the name of Stalin on his lips.

After the secret trial, Yezhov was allowed to return to his cell; half an hour later, he was called back and told that he had been condemned to death. On hearing the verdict, Yezhov became faint and began to collapse, but the guards caught him and removed him from the room. An immediate appeal for clemency was denied, and Yezhov became hysterical and wept. He soon had to be dragged out of the room, struggling with the guards and screaming.

Execution 

On 4 February 1940, Yezhov was shot by future KGB chairman Ivan Serov (or by Vasily Blokhin, in the presence of N. P. Afanasev, according to one book source) in the basement of a small NKVD station on Varsonofevskii Lane (Varsonofyevskiy pereulok) in Moscow. The basement had a sloping floor so that it could be hosed down after executions, and had been built according to Yezhov's own specifications near the Lubyanka. The main NKVD execution chamber in the basement of the Lubyanka was deliberately avoided to ensure total secrecy.

Yezhov's body was immediately cremated and his ashes dumped in a common grave at Moscow's Donskoye Cemetery. The execution remained secret and as late as 1948, Time reported "Some think he is still in an insane asylum".

Legacy 

In Russia, Yezhov remains mostly known as the person who was responsible for atrocities of the Great Purge that he conducted on Stalin's orders. Among art historians, he also has the nickname "The Vanishing Commissar" because after his execution, his likeness was retouched out of an official press photo; he is among the best-known examples of the Soviet press making someone who had fallen out of favour "disappear".

Due to his role in the Great Purge, Yezhov has not been officially rehabilitated by the Soviet and Russian authorities.

Honors and awards 
 Order of Lenin
 Order of the Red Banner (Mongolia)
 Badge of "Honorary Security Officer"

A decree of the Presidium of the Supreme Soviet on 24 January 1941 deprived Yezhov of all state and special awards.

See also 

Article 58 (RSFSR Penal Code)
Bibliography of Stalinism and the Soviet Union
Censorship of images in the Soviet Union
Chronology of Soviet secret police agencies
Everyday Stalinism: Ordinary Life in Extraordinary Times: Soviet Russia in the 1930s
Stalin: Waiting for Hitler, 1929–1941, the second volume in an extensive three-volume biography of Joseph Stalin
Stalin's Peasants: Resistance and Survival in the Russian Village after Collectivization

Notes

Cited works

External links 

 Nikita Petrov, Marc Jansen: Stalin's Loyal Executioner: People's Commissar Nikolai Ezhov, 1895-1940 (full text in PDF)
 Interrogations of Nikolai Ezhov, former People's Commissar for Internal Affairs
 "The Commissar Vanishes: The falsification of images in Stalin's Russia" at the Index on Censorship website (includes airbrushed images of the Vanishing Commissar) 

1895 births
1940 deaths
NKVD officers
Politicians from Saint Petersburg
People from Sankt-Peterburgsky Uyezd
Russian LGBT people
Russian LGBT politicians
Old Bolsheviks
Politburo of the Central Committee of the Communist Party of the Soviet Union candidate members
People's commissars and ministers of the Soviet Union
First convocation members of the Verkhovna Rada of the Ukrainian Soviet Socialist Republic
First convocation members of the Soviet of the Union
Commissars General of State Security
Directors of intelligence agencies
Russian communists
Police misconduct
Soviet show trials
Russian military personnel of World War I
Soviet military personnel of the Russian Civil War
Russian mass murderers
Recipients of the Order of Lenin
Great Purge perpetrators
Politicide perpetrators
People executed by the Soviet Union by firearm
Nonpersons in the Eastern Bloc
Executed Russian people
Russian people executed by the Soviet Union
Burials at Donskoye Cemetery
Executed mass murderers